Saint Apollonius was a Christian of ancient Rome who was executed in the 2nd century AD, during the reign of the Roman emperor Commodus. He is said to have been a Roman senator. At his trial he mounted a defense of Christianity in the Roman senate, which was afterwards translated into Greek and inserted by church historian Eusebius in his history of the Christian martyrs, but is now lost.

He is the same as Saint Apollonius the Apologist.

Nicephorus I of Constantinople confuses this Apollonius with Apollonius, bishop of Ephesus who wrote against the Cataphryges.

Notes

2nd-century Christian martyrs
Senators of the Roman Empire